The 1950 winners of the Torneo di Viareggio (in English, the Viareggio Tournament, officially the Viareggio Cup World Football Tournament Coppa Carnevale), the annual youth football tournament held in Viareggio, Tuscany, are listed below.

Format

The 12 teams are organized in knockout rounds, all played single tie. The four foreign teams had a bye to the quarter finals.

Participating teams
Italian teams

  Fiorentina
  Lazio
  Milan
  Modena
  Novara
  Roma
  Sampdoria
  Viareggio

European teams

  First Vienna
  Racing Paris
  Servette
  Triestina

Tournament fixtures

Champions

Footnotes

External links
 Official Site (Italian)
 Results on RSSSF.com

1950
1949–50 in Italian football
1949–50 in French football
1949–50 in Swiss football
1949–50 in Austrian football